An Umbrella for Lovers is a 1986 Soviet drama film directed by Rodion Nakhapetov.

Plot 
The film tells about a man and a woman who have long been in love with each other. But he has a family, because of which they cannot be together. And suddenly they meet with a familiar young couple...

Cast 
 Aleksey Batalov as Dmitriy Pavlovich Kraskov
 Nijole Ozelyte as Vera
 Vera Glagoleva as Zoya
 Nikita Mikhaylovsky as Tolya
 Vyacheslav Yezepov as Yuriy
 Igor Nefyodov as Gosha
 Alla Meshcheryakova as Kraskov's wife
 Galina Petrova as Lida
 Galina Dyomina as Vera's mother
 Vladimir Nosik as Frolikov

References

External links 
 

1986 films
1980s Russian-language films
Soviet drama films
1986 drama films